The Mycetopodidae are a family of freshwater pearly mussels in the order Unionida restricted to South America.  They are named for the mushroom-like shape of their foot.  Like all members of the Unionida they reproduce via a larval stage that temporarily parasitizes fish.  Banarescu lists four subfamilies with ten genera in total.

Classification
Four subfamilies are recognized.

Anodontitinae

 Anodontites

Mycetopodinae

 Mycetopoda
 Mycetopodella

Monocondylaeinae

 Monocondylaea
 Haasica
 Iheringella
 Fossula
 Tamsiella
 Diplodontites

Leilinae

 Leila

References

Bivalve families
Unionida
Taxa named by John Edward Gray